Qeshlaq-e Najaf Khanlu (also Romanized as Qeshlāq-e Najaf Khānlū; also known as Najaf Khānlū) is a village in Qeshlaq Rural District, in the Central District of Ahar County, East Azerbaijan Province, Iran. At the 2006 census, its population was 74, in 13 families.

References 

Populated places in Ahar County